Americanism may refer to:
 American nationalism
 Any characteristic feature of American English
 Americanism (ideology), an early 20th-century ideology frequently posited in opposition to communism or anarchism
 Americanism (heresy), a group of related beliefs supporting individualism and the separation of church and state that are regarded as heretical by the Catholic Church
 "Americanism", a song by MxPx from their album Teenage Politics

See also 
 American exceptionalism
 Americanist (disambiguation)
 Americanization (disambiguation)
 Anti-Americanism
 Comparison of American and British English
 Culture of the United States
 Pan-Americanism
 Pro-American (disambiguation)